Yassine Amrioui (born 21 February 1995) is a professional footballer who plays as a left-back. Born in France and a youth international for that nation, he also possesses Moroccan nationality and has been selected for their 'A' team (domestic league players).

Career

Lokomotiv Plovdiv
For Season 2016–17, Amrioui signed a three-year contract with Bulgarian club Lokomotiv Plovdiv. He was included in the main squad for the match against Levski Sofia. During the same game he made his debut in the A Group, providing an assist for the first goal in the match for the team.

Ittihad Riadi Tanger
On 10 July 2017, Amrioui signed a 1-year contract with Ittihad de Tanger. He also made his debut in  FRMF with the Head Coach Jamal Sellami

Olympique Ckub Khouribga
On 17 January 2018, Amrioui signed 2 years and half contract with OCK.

References

External links
 
 

Living people
1995 births
French footballers
French sportspeople of Moroccan descent
France youth international footballers
Sportspeople from Nancy, France
Footballers from Grand Est
Association football defenders
PFC Lokomotiv Plovdiv players
FC Tsarsko Selo Sofia players
Ittihad Tanger players
Olympique Club de Khouribga players
AS FAR (football) players
Championnat National 2 players
Championnat National 3 players
Botola players
First Professional Football League (Bulgaria) players
Moroccan footballers
French expatriate footballers
French expatriate sportspeople in Bulgaria
Expatriate footballers in Bulgaria
Moroccan expatriate footballers
Moroccan expatriate sportspeople in Bulgaria
Morocco A' international footballers